Nueva Frontera is a municipality in the Honduran department of Santa Bárbara.

Demographics
At the time of the 2013 Honduras census, Nueva Frontera municipality had a population of 13,069. Of these, 92.33% were Mestizo, 6.72% White, 0.37% Black or Afro-Honduran, 0.28% Indigenous and 0.29% others.

References

Municipalities of the Santa Bárbara Department, Honduras